This is a list of breweries, wineries, and distilleries in Manitoba, Canada.

Breweries, wineries, and distilleries in Manitoba

See also
 Beer in Canada
 Canadian wine
 List of breweries in Canada

References

Manitoba

Manitoba
Alcohol in Manitoba

Manitoba
Manitoba
Cuisine of Manitoba

Lists of buildings and structures in Manitoba
Manitoba
Manitoba